
This list of cemeteries in Vermilion County, Illinois includes currently operating, historical (closed for new interments), and defunct (graves abandoned or removed) cemeteries, columbaria, and mausolea which are historical and/or notable. It does not include pet cemeteries.

See also 

 List of cemeteries in the United States
 List of cemeteries in Ogle County, Illinois
 List of cemeteries in Illinois

References

External links

VermilionCounty.INFO - Cemetery project for Vermilion County IL & Surrounding counties (list, description, & map of every cemetery including pictures of every headstone).
Cemetery Locator Project for Vermilion County, IL

Cemeteries
Vermilion County
Vermilion County, Illinois
Cemeteries in Vermilion County, Illinois
Cemeteries in Illinois by county